Events in the year 2018 in Vietnam.

Incumbents
Party General Secretary: Nguyễn Phú Trọng
President: Trần Đại Quang (until 21 September), Nguyễn Phú Trọng (since 23 October)
Prime Minister: Nguyễn Xuân Phúc
Assembly Chairperson: Nguyễn Thị Kim Ngân

Events

23 March – A fire at a condominium complex in Ho Chi Minh City, Vietnam, kills at least 13 people and injures another 27, with most people dying of suffocation or jumping from high floors.

15–21 July – Tropical Storm Son-Tinh hits Vietnam, causing floods and landslides in areas around Hanoi.
23 October – Nguyễn Phú Trọng is sworn in to the post of President of Vietnam, becoming the third Vietnamese official to simultaneously lead the Communist Party while serving as head of state.

Deaths

4 February – Hoàng Vân, songwriter and composer (b.  1930).

11 February – Lâm Ngươn Tánh, military officer (b. 1928)

6 March – Paul Bùi Văn Đọc, Roman Catholic prelate (b. 1944)

17 March – Phan Văn Khải, politician (b.  1933).

23 June – Phan Huy Lê, historian (b. 1934).

21 September – Trần Đại Quang, politician (b. 1956).

1 October – Đỗ Mười, politician (b. 1917).

References

 
2010s in Vietnam
Years of the 21st century in Vietnam
Vietnam
Vietnam